The 2010–11 LEB Oro season is the 15th season of the Liga Española de Baloncesto. It's named too Adecco Oro by sponsorship reasons. The 306-game regular season (34 games for each of the 18 teams) began on Friday, October 1, 2010, and will end on Friday, April 15, 2011. The champion of the regular season will be promoted to Liga ACB. The teams between 2nd and 9th position will play a best of 5 games play off, where the winner will be promoted too to the higher division. The teams 16th and 17th will play a best of 5 games play-out where the loser will be relegated to LEB Plata, with the 18th team.

Competition format

Eligibility of players 
All teams must have in their roster:
 A minimum of six eligible players with the Spanish national team.
 A maximum of two non-EU players.
 A maximum of three EU players, which one can be a player from an ACP country.
 If a team has not two non-EU players, it can sign a player of everywhere.

Teams can not sign any player after February 28.

Regular season 
Each team of every division has to play with all the other teams of its division twice, once at home and the other at the opponent's stadium. This means that in Liga LEB the league ends after every team plays 34 games.

Like many other leagues in continental Europe, the Liga LEB takes a winter break once each team has played half its schedule. One feature of the league that may be unusual to North American observers is that the two halves of the season are played in the same order—that is, the order of each team's first-half fixtures is repeated in the second half of the season, with the only difference being the arenas used. This procedure is typical in Europe; it is also used by La Liga in football.

If two or more teams have got the same number of winning games, the criteria of tie-breaking are these:
 Head-to-head winning games.
 Head-to-head points difference.
 Total points difference.

At the final of the season:
 The regular season winner promotes directly to Liga ACB.
 Teams qualified between 2nd and 9th, will join the promotion play-offs to ACB.
 Teams qualified in 16th and 17th will play a relegation play-out to LEB Plata.
 Team qualified in 18th position is relegated directly to LEB Plata.

Team information 
CB Murcia and Xacobeo Blu:sens were directly relegated from ACB after finishing in the bottom two places and they will substitute CAI Zaragoza (champion) and ViveMenorca.

CB Cornellà and Ciudad de Vigo Básquet left the league after finishing in 17th and 18th position. Also, CB Cornellà lost the play-out with CB Tarragona 2017. Fundación Adepal Alcázar as champion of LEB Plata and Lobe Huesca as LEB Plata play-off winner will enjoy the league.

Tenerife Baloncesto renounced because of a future fusion with CB 1939 Canarias and Bàsquet Mallorca will play LEB Plata after the Spanish Basketball Federation didn't accept their request. CE Lleida Bàsquet and Grupo Iruña Navarra will substitute them.

Managerial changes

Before the start of the season

During the season 

1Josep Maria Izquierdo signed before the relegation playoffs.

Regular season

Results 
Results on FEB.es

League table 

1UB La Palma were docked one point for problems with Chukwudinma Odiakosa's trading in day 1.
(C) means Copa Príncipe Champion.

Positions by round 

 UB La Palma with one point deducted.

Copa Príncipe de Asturias 
At the half of the league, the two first teams in the table play the Copa Príncipe de Asturias at home of the winner of the first half season (17th round). The Champion of this Cup will play the play-offs as first qualified if it finishes the league between the 2nd and the 5th qualified. The Copa Príncipe will be played on January 30, 2011.

Teams qualified

The game

Playoffs

Promotion playoffs 

Teams qualified from 2nd to 9th will play the promotion play-off. If the winner of Copa Príncipe is qualified between 2nd and 5th at the final of the Regular Season, it will join the play-offs as 2nd qualified. Three best-of-five series will decide who promotes to ACB.

Blu:sens Monbús promotes to Liga ACB as second qualified

Relegation playoffs 
The loser of a best-of-five series will be relegated to LEB Plata.

Stats leaders in regular season

Points

Rebounds

Assists

Performance Index Rating

MVP week by week

Honors

All LEB Oro team 
  Pedro Rivero (CB Murcia)
  Levi Rost (Girona FC)
  Micah Downs (Ford Burgos)
  Ricardo Guillén (Isla de Tenerife Canarias)
  Oriol Junyent (Blu:sens Monbús)

MVP of the regular season 
  Ricardo Guillén (Isla de Tenerife Canarias)

Coach of the season 
  Luis Guil (CB Murcia)

References

External links 
 LEB Oro page in the FEB website
 Competition rules

 
LEB Oro seasons
LEB2
Spain
Second level Spanish basketball league seasons